Coincidance: A Head Test is a 1988 book by Robert Anton Wilson, published in 1988 in the United States. It consist of series of essays in four parts prefaced by a foreword from the author. It covers familiar Wilson territory such as the writings of James Joyce, Carl Jung, linguistics and coincidence.

As explained on the back cover the title is a deliberate misspelling suggesting the “mad dervish whirl of coincidence and synchronicity” to be found within.

1988 non-fiction books
Discordianism
Consciousness studies
Books by Robert Anton Wilson
Essay collections